Brittany Anjou (born May 17, 1984) is a New York City-based musician, composer, pianist, vibraphonist and producer from Seattle, Washington. She performs with her own jazz groups, directs ensembles, works as a sideman and leads several projects as a composer, multi-instrumentalist, vocalist and songwriter.

Biography 
Anjou studied jazz while growing up in Seattle. She performed with Clark Terry and Wynton Marsalis before attending New York University, where she studied jazz with Stefon Harris, Don Friedman, Gil Goldstein, George Garzone, Sherrie Maricle, Jason Moran, Ralph Alessi, Vijay Iyer, and Rudresh Manhanthappa. 

Anjou studied music in Prague, with Emil Viclicky and Milan Slavický, and studied traditional Gyil in Ghana, with xylophonists Bernard Woma, Jerome Balsab, and Alfred Kpebsaane.

In 2021, Anjou graduated from the University of Sheffield with a masters degree in Music Psychology, Education and Wellbeing.

Music 
Anjou self-released nine albums of original music ranging from modern big band jazz, experimental improvisation, electronic experimental vibraphone, hardcore, punk, death metal, spoken word and jazz piano trio.

Enamiĝo Reciprokataj (2019) 
In February 2019, Anjou released her debut piano album Enamiĝo Reciprokataj, on Origin Records, a phrase in the Esperanto language meaning "falling in love reciprocated" or "mutual breakdown." The album features Greg Chudzik, Nick Anderson, Ben Perowsky, and Ari Folman-Cohen. The album received positive reviews from Downbeat Magazine, Amazon, All About Jazz, NYC Jazz Record, and France Musique. She has been called a "virtuosa" and "highly sophisticated".

The Shaggs, Dot Wiggin Band, Bi TYRANT 
In 2012, Anjou began performing with members of The Shaggs, and helped to form, record and tour The Dot Wiggin Band, of which she is the co-vocalist, and frequently interviewed about. At the invitation of American band Wilco, The Shaggs performed at the 2017 Solid Sound Festival at Mass MoCA. Anjou supported as the stand-in bassist and vocalist with Dot and Betty Wiggin for their second time onstage together in over 46 years. The backing band included guitarist Richard Bennett (Friendly Bears), drummer Laura Cromwell, and guitarist Jesse Krakow (Time of Orchids, Shudder to Think). With other members, Anjou fronts the experimental punk group, Bi TYRANT.

L.A.R.C.E.N.Y. 
In 2013, Anjou founded LARCENY (Lethal Activists Revitalizing Creativity Enaction in New York), a 25-member chamber ensemble which performs Anjou's arrangements. Instrumentation includes trumpet, trombones, flute, alto flute, saxophones, violins, viola, cello, turntables and rhythm section. The group is known for an annual tribute concert of Portishead's Roseland NYC Live album at Le Poisson Rouge in NYC.

Other appearances 
Anjou has toured as a pianist, keyboardist, vibraphonist, and background vocalist for US singer-songwriter Sophie Auster, the Dot Wiggin Band, The Shaggs, Ravens and Chimes, and Oren Bloedow. 

In 2016, Anjou composed a live score for theater piece In the Eruptive Mode: Hijacked Voices of the Arab Spring, by Sulayman Al Bassam. The work premiered in Kuwait, Beirut, Tunis, and Metz, France, and was reviewed positively by French and Arab press.

In 2009, she was an artist in residence at Kuwait’s Sheikh Jaber Al-Ahmad Cultural Center opera house.

References 

American women composers
American jazz pianists
American vibraphonists
American jazz composers
Women jazz composers
Outsider musicians
Women jazz pianists
American women jazz musicians
Living people
American punk rock musicians
1984 births
21st-century American women pianists
21st-century American pianists